Before You Know It is a 2019 American comedy film directed by Hannah Pearl Utt. It was co-written by, and stars, Utt and Jen Tullock. Judith Light, Mike Colter, Mandy Patinkin, and Alec Baldwin appear in supporting roles. It was screened in the U.S. Dramatic Competition section at the 2019 Sundance Film Festival.

Plot
The film centres on a dysfunctional and codependent family who are struggling to maintain the family business, a small community theatre in New York City, where father Mel performsin plays he has writtento an ever dwindling audience. Mel's eldest daughter, Jackie, is a quirky actress stuck in perennial adolescence despite being mother to teenage daughter Dodge. Mel's younger daughter, Rachel, is a business-minded lesbian whose attempts to be the responsible member of the family have made her something of a control freak.

Mel self-sabotages a playwright fellowship, complete with a major premiere of his latest play, that Rachel has lined up for him. Her angry outburst is followed minutes later by him having a fatal heart attack, which leads to the discovery that he had lied to her and Jackie for much of their lives about the identity and death of their mother; their real mother is in fact soap opera actress Sherrell, who has been left ownership of the theatre and the family home in Mel's will.

Cast

Reception 
The site's critical consensus reads, "Before You Know It wrings an entertaining dramedy out of one family's fraught dynamic thanks to wise, witty writing and sharp work from a talented ensemble."

Beandrea July of The Hollywood Reporter writes, “A strong debut that pushes the boundaries of what movies made from the female gaze can mean to audiences of all kinds...engrossing and entertaining." Nick Allen of RogerEbert.com writes, “A refreshing comedy...not afraid to be silly or tender."

References

External links
 

2019 films
2019 comedy films
2019 LGBT-related films
2010s English-language films
American comedy films
American LGBT-related films
Lesbian-related films
LGBT-related comedy films
1091 Media films
2010s American films